Yeghegnut or Yekheknut or Yekhegnut or Yegegnut or Eghegnut may refer to:
Yeghegnut, Armavir, Armenia
Yeghegnut, Lori, Armenia
Yeghegnut, Shahumyan, Nagorno-Karabakh